Shirokaya is a rural locality (a village) in Zelentsovskoye Rural Settlement, Nikolsky District, Vologda Oblast, Russia. The population was 26 as of 2002.

Geography 
Shirokaya is located 64 km northwest of Nikolsk (the district's administrative centre) by road. Sharzhenga is the nearest rural locality.

References 

Rural localities in Nikolsky District, Vologda Oblast